Dennis Mahan Michie (April 10, 1870 – July 1, 1898) was a United States Army officer and college football coach. He served as the first head football coach and captain at the United States Military Academy in 1890. He served again as captain of the Army football team in 1891 and again as head football coach in 1892. He compiled a record of 3–2–1 as head coach. Michie attended The Lawrenceville School in New Jersey, graduating in 1888. 

Michie was killed at the Bloody Bend of the San Juan River in the Spanish–American War. Army's home football stadium, Michie Stadium, was dedicated in his honor when it opened in 1924.

Head coaching record

See also
 List of college football head coaches with non-consecutive tenure

References

1870 births
1898 deaths
Army Black Knights football coaches
American military personnel killed in the Spanish–American War
United States Army officers
United States Military Academy alumni
Lawrenceville School alumni
People from West Point, New York
Sportspeople from New York (state)